Saint Privat en Périgord (literally Saint Privat in Périgord) is a commune in the department of Dordogne, southwestern France. The municipality was established on 1 January 2017 by merger of the former communes of Saint-Privat-des-Prés (the seat), Festalemps and Saint-Antoine-Cumond.

See also 
Communes of the Dordogne department

References 

Saintprivatenperigord